North Lamar Independent School District is a public school district based in Paris, Texas (USA).

The district serves northern portions of Paris, the cities of Reno and Sun Valley, as well as the communities of Arthur City, Chicota, Powderly, and Sumner in northern Lamar County. A very small portion of northeastern Fannin County also lies within the district. North Lamar ISD is also the largest 4A school district in northeast Texas, by land size.

In 2009, the school district was rated "recognized" by the Texas Education Agency.

On July 6, 2017, North Lamar ISD developed their own Police Department consisting of one Chief and three officers. The officers are strategically placed throughout the district   for the protection of the students, staff and community. Officers also teach character education programs such as D.A.R.E. And Gang Resistance Education and Training. Their goal is to provide a safe learning environment while making a positive impact in the lives of the students.

District Administration
Superintendent - Kelli Stewart
Assistant Superintendent - Dr. Angela Chadwick
Assistant Superintendent - Leslie Watson
North Lamar High School Principal - Mark Keith
Frank Stone Middle School Principal - Loy Clark
Geneva Bailey Intermediate School Principal - Angela Compton 
Aaron Parker Elementary School Principal - Kristin Hughes
Cecil Everett Elementary School Principal - Angela Compton
W. L. Higgins Elementary School Principal - Lori Malone
Chief of Police - Mike Boaz

Board of trustees
President- Shiela Daughtrey
Vice President- Stephen Holmes
Secretary- Bo Exum 
Member- Clint Spencer
Member- Lauren Woodard
Member- Joel Sanders
Member- Russell Jackson

Schools
North Lamar ISD has six schools - five are located in Paris and one (Parker Elementary) is located in Powderly.

North Lamar High School- Grades 9-12
Enrollment is approximately 850
Frank Stone Middle School- Grades 6-8
Enrollment is approximately 800
Bailey Intermediate School- Grades 4 and 5
Everett Elementary School- Grades 2 & 3
Everett serves children in grades 2 and 3 from the southern section of the district.
Higgins Elementary School- Grades PK-1
Parker Elementary School- Grades PK-5

School song

(to the tune of Love me Tender)
We will raise our voice in song
To our Alma Mater true
Our hearts are filled with loyalty
To our colors-Gold and Blue
North Lamar, North Lamar
We're proud to claim your name
And as years go by you'll grow
In Honor and in fame.

History
The history of North Lamar goes back to the 68 rural school districts that once existed throughout the communities in the northern half of Lamar County.  Upon the consolidation of Powderly-Reno and Central school districts in 1970-71, the district became known as North Lamar Independent School District.  In 1975, the Chicota schools joined the district.  The area economy includes manufacturing, farming and ranching.  With an enrollment of approximately 3,150 students, North Lamar ISD has one high school, one middle school, and four elementary schools to serve the students in the district.

Notable faculty

Marsha Farney, former faculty member at North Lamar; Republican member of the Texas House of Representatives from District 20 in Williamson County

References

External links
North Lamar ISD
 North Lamar High School
 Frank Stone Middle School
 Geneva Bailey Intermediate
 Cecil Everett Elementary School
 W. L. Higgins Elementary School
 Aaron Parker Elementary

School districts in Lamar County, Texas
School districts in Fannin County, Texas